Evan Shanks (born October 10, 1964) is an American rock bassist for Symbol Six and Entropy.

Career 
In the early 1980s, Entropy played such venues as Grand Olympic Auditorium and Cathay de Grande right in the heart of Los Angeles / Orange County Punk rock. They went on to play a steady stream of shows for Goldenvoice: 45 Grave, The Circle Jerks, NOFX, The Melvins, The Minutemen, The Butthole Surfers, 7 Seconds, DI, The Toy Dolls, The Effigies, Wasted Youth, English Dogs, D.R.I. (band), Detox, The Dickies, Conflict, and  The Dead Kennedys.

 In 2009, Ace & Eights performed with Slash and Steven Adler of Guns N' Roses.

Shanks is currently the bassist for the Los Angeles rock band Symbol Six.

Musicians collaborated with 
 Eric Leach, Tony Fate, Phil George, Taz Rudd: Symbol Six
 Phil George, Patrick Stone, Taz Rudd: Aces N' Eights
 Entropy

Discography 
 1985 Gross National Product EP - ENTROPY Catalog #BI-001 (Bad Idea Music )
 1986 Kaaos Zine Presents - ENTROPY Catalog #BCT 21 (Bad Compilation Tapes )
 2005 Farewell To Venice - ENTROPY (BDF Records )
 2006 Post-Industrial Hardcore - ENTROPY
 2010 Monsters 11 - SYMBOL SIX (Symbol Six Music)
 2014 Dirtyland - SYMBOL SIX Catalog #JHR 049 (Jailhouse Records) 
 2014 SYMBOL SIX/Fang (band) Split Catalog #JHR 047 (Jailhouse Records)
 2015 SYMBOL SIX/Rikk Agnew Split Catalog #JHR 055 (Jailhouse Records)

Gallery

References

External links
 

1964 births
Living people